Ceratoxancus teramachii is a species of sea snail, a marine gastropod mollusk in the family Costellariidae.

Description

Distribution

References

Costellariidae
Gastropods described in 1952